A landslide is a geological phenomenon.

It may also refer to:

Arts and entertainment

Film and television
 Landslide (1937 film), a British drama film
 Landslide (1940 film), a Hungarian drama film
 , a film by Jean-Claude Lord
 "Landslide" (Heroes), an episode of the television series Heroes

Music
 Landslide (album) (1980), by American jazz saxophonist Dexter Gordon 
 Landslide (musician), dubstep musician Tim Land
 "Landslide" (Fleetwood Mac song), 1975
 "Landslide" (Olivia Newton-John song), 1982
 "Landslide", a song from the 1983 album Flick of the Switch by AC/DC
 "Landslide", a song from the 2015 album Southernality by the country group A Thousand Horses
 "Landslide", a song from the 2019 album Gallipoli by Beirut

Other uses in arts and entertainment
 Landslide (board game), the name of two board games about the U.S. presidential elections
 Landslide (novel), a 1967 thriller novel by Desmond Bagley
 Landslide (Wolff book), a 2021 non-fiction book by Michael Wolff
 Landslide (Transformers), a fictional character in Transformers: Cybertron

Other uses
 Landslide victory, a term used in politics
 Landslides (journal), a scientific journal
 Landslide, wireless network traffic modeling equipment used by Spirent Communications

See also
 Psilocybe caerulescens, also known as the landslide mushroom